Vikhorevka is a town in Bratsky District of Irkutsk Oblast, Russia, located on the left bank of the Vikhorevka River (Angara River's tributary),  northwest of Irkutsk, the administrative center of the oblast, and  southwest of Bratsk. Population:

History
It was founded in 1957 as a workers' settlement due to the construction of the western section of the Baikal–Amur Mainline between Tayshet and Bratsk. The river, the railway station, and the town were named after Vikhor Savin, a Strelets sotnik who was killed here by the Tungus people in 1630. It was granted town status in 1966.

Administrative and municipal status
Within the framework of administrative divisions, Vikhorevka is subordinated to Bratsky District. As a municipal division, the town of Vikhorevka is incorporated within Bratsky Municipal District as Vikhorevskoye Urban Settlement.

Economy
The town's economy relies mainly on timber production, as well as a railway depot.

References

Notes

Sources

Registry of the Administrative-Territorial Formations of Irkutsk Oblast 

Cities and towns in Irkutsk Oblast